Assem Akram (born 1965) is an Afghan historian, and author from Kabul, Afghanistan.

Akram holds a PhD in history from the University of Paris.

Works

 The 1492' Conspiracy, A Machiavellian Plot to Seize the Holy Land and Keep the White House, Three-Horned Lion, June 2006, USA, 304 pages, English. 
 A Study On Mohammad Daoud Khan (Negahe ba Shakhsiat, Nazariat wa Siassat ha-ye Sardar Mohammad Daoud), Mizan Publishing, August 2001, Alexandria-VA, 440 pages in  Persian. 
 History of the War of Afghanistan (Histoire de la guerre d’Afghanistan), Balland Publishing House, December 1996, Paris, 641 pages, in French. Re-printed in June 1998 & in December 2001 with updates.
 Fatal Ochre (Ocre fatale), Balland Publishing House, February 2001, Paris; fiction, 230 pages, in French.

1965 births
Living people
Historians of Asia
20th-century Afghan historians
21st-century Afghan historians